The Scaled Composites Triumph was a twin-engine, business jet prototype designed and built by Burt Rutan's Scaled Composites for Beechcraft. It was known officially as the Model 143, and internally at Scaled as the "Tuna". The aircraft is a three lifting surface design, with both a small canard, and a small conventional horizontal stabilizer in a T-tail configuration.

Design and development
Originally, three versions of the all-composite aircraft were envisioned, one powered by piston engines, one by turboprops and one by turbofans. The only one built was the turbofan version with engines mounted on top of the wings, which was first aircraft to be powered by the Williams International FJ44 engine. The maiden flight took place at the Mojave Airport on July 12, 1988.

The flight test program was completed and confirmed the targeted performance. The financial situation of Beech at the time, and competing projects, prevented consideration of commercial production. In February 1991, Rutan stated, "it had the potential for enormous improvements in efficiency compared to the King Air. It was as fast as the Citation II, but had 60% better fuel economy." After the test program was completed, the airframe was mounted on a pedestal at Scaled's Mojave facility for several years. The Triumph is currently on display in the Joe Davies Heritage Airpark  at Palmdale Plant 42.

Specifications

See also

References

 Lambert, Mark. Jane's All The World's Aircraft 1990–91. Coulsdon, UK: Jane's Defence Data, 1990. .

External links

Goleta Air and Space Museum
Scaled Composites Model 143 "Triumph" Gallery Selected image
Gallery of "Triumph"

Beechcraft
Three-surface aircraft
Canard aircraft
Rutan aircraft
1980s United States experimental aircraft
Twinjets
Engine-over-wing aircraft
Aircraft first flown in 1988